Jean-Baptiste Girard may refer to:

 Jean-Baptiste Girard (pedagogue) (1765–1850), Swiss Franciscan educator
 Jean-Baptiste Girard (soldier) (1775–1815), French soldier of the Napoleonic Wars
  (1680–1733), a priest tried for witchcraft, abuse and corruption of Catherine Cadière

See also
Jean-Baptiste
Girard (surname)
Jean-Baptiste Giraud, French sculptor